The Corax, also known as Raven (Corax being Latin for raven), is a prototype unmanned aerial vehicle (UAV) for the British Armed Forces being developed by BAE Systems Military Air & Information.

Its first test flight was in 2004 after a ten-month development cycle. It was first unveiled to the public in January 2006.

Corax uses stealth technology.

See also

References

External links
Flight International article on the unveiling of Corax

Unmanned stealth aircraft
British Aerospace aircraft
2000s British experimental aircraft
Unmanned military aircraft of the United Kingdom
BAE Systems research and development